Bledar Hodo (born 21 June 1985) is an Albanian professional footballer who most recently played as a midfielder for Teuta Durrës in the Albanian Superliga.

Club career

Teuta Durrës
On 1 February 2013, Hodo completed a transfer to Teuta Durrës as a free agent, returning to his boyhood club for the second time. His return debut came on 23 February in the 1–1 away draw against Tirana, playing full-90 minutes. Following this, he went on to make further 12 appearances, all of them as starter, as Teuta finished 3rd in the league, securing thus a spot in 2013–14 UEFA Europa League first qualifying round.

Honours
Teuta Durrës
Albanian Cup: 2004–05

References

External links

1985 births
Living people
Footballers from Durrës
Albanian footballers
Albania under-21 international footballers
Association football midfielders
KF Teuta Durrës players
KF Bylis Ballsh players
KS Shkumbini Peqin players
KF Vllaznia Shkodër players
FK Tomori Berat players
Kategoria Superiore players